Mmem (Bafmeng) is a Grassfields Bantu language of Cameroon.

As a Centre Ring language of Narrow Grassfields, a subdivision of Wide Grassfields within the Southern Bantoid languages, Mmen is part of a cluster including six other languages i.e. Babanki, Bum, Kom, Kuk, Kung and Oku (Lewis 2009).

Etymology 
The name Mmen ([mɛn]) comes from the verb sé mwɛ̀yn [sémɣɛ̀yn] ‘to open up thick bush-covered land’ and is used by the speakers referring to both their language and their land. 

Ethnologue (Lewis 2009) and ALCAM, Atlas Linguistique du Cameroon (Dieu and Renaud 1983) use the name and spelling Mmen.

Bafumen is the name of the village where the largest number of speakers is found i.e. 30 000 (Troyer, et al. 1995:8) and the name adopted by German colonizers for the area and formerly used for the language. Other villages where Mmen is spoken are Cha’, Yemgeh, Nyos, Ipalim among others.

Bibliography
AGHA-AH, Chiatoh Blasius. "The Noun Class System of Mmen." 1993.
AGHA, G.B. "The  Phonology of Mmen." 1987.
BANGHA, George F. "The Mmen Noun Phrase." 2003.
BJÖRKESTEDT, Lena. "Mmen Orthography Guide." 2011.
BJÖRKESTEDT, Lena. "A Phonological Sketch of the Mmen Language." 2011.
HUEY, Paul; MBONGUE, Joseph; TROYER, Duane, authors. 1995. A rapid appraisal survey of Mmen (ALCAM 821) and Aghem dialects (ALCAM 810), Menchum Division, Northwest Province.

References

External links 

 A Phonological Sketch of the Mmen Language Information about the Mmen language and its speakers

Ring languages
Languages of Cameroon